Bab Souika is one of the gates of the medina of Tunis.
 
It was demolished in 1861. Its situation was between Bab El Khadra and Bab Saadoun, near the Halfaouine district and gave its name to the surrounding neighborhood.

Bab Souika means "the gate of the small souk".

References

Souika
Buildings and structures demolished in 1861